Lobular neoplasia can refer to:
 Lobular carcinoma in situ
 Invasive lobular carcinoma